The men's singles squash event at the 2019 Pan American Games will be held from July 25th – July 27th at the CAR Voleibol en la Videna in Lima, Peru.

Format
Each National Olympic Committee could enter a maximum of two athletes into the competition. The athletes will be drawn into an elimination stage draw. Once an athlete lost a match, they will be no longer able to compete. Each match will be contested as the best of five games.

Results

Final

Top half

Bottom half

References

External links
Results

Men's singles